Professor Ikechukwu Nosike Simplicius Dozie  (born 3 March 1966) is a professor of Microbiology (Medical Microbiology & Parasitology), a public health scientist, teacher and community health specialist currently serving at the Department of Public Health, Federal University of Technology Owerri, Nigeria. He is a member of American Society of Tropical Medicine & Hygiene (ASTMH). Dozie was a consultant to the World Health Organisation; WHO’s African programme for Onchocerciasis. He is the Director, Linkages and Advancement, Federal University of Technology Owerri .

Early life and education 
Professor Dozie was born in Umuokisi  Amuzi, Ahiazu Mbaise local government area of Imo State, Nigeria. He got the First School Leaving Certificate from Agbani Road Primary School, Enugu, Enugu State. He attended Mbaise Secondary School, Aboh-Mbaise, Imo State and obtained the West Africa School Certificate with Division One in 1980. Dozie holds a BSc. combined honours in Microbiology/Biochemistry and an MSc Medical Microbiology from the University of Nigeria, Nsukka and a PhD in Public Health Parasitology, University of Jos. His quest for further skill sets in higher education management  to him to Galilee International Management Institute (GIMI) Israel in 2010 and 2014.

Professional career 
Dozie started his teaching career in 1992 as an Assistant Lecturer at Imo State University Owerri, Nigeria  where he was promoted  to the rank of  a Professor in 2005. He was engaged as a Visiting Professor at the Federal University of Technology Owerri, Nigeria  between 2007-2010 while on  leave of Absence from Imo State University Owerri. He was Head, Department of Public Health Technology, Dean, School of Health Technology and Member, 11th Governing Council of the Federal University of Technology Owerri.

Dozie engagement in other National Assignments include Panel Moderator at the 2nd High-Level Meeting (HLM) of the GlobalPower Women Network Africa (GPWNA) organized by the Government of Nigeria in collaboration with the African Union and with support of UNAIDS, Abuja June 27–28, 2013; Facilitator, Induction Course for Ambassador-Designates by Ministry of Foreign Affairs Nigeria, December 9 – 13, 2013; Panellist, 2014 Commonwealth Scholarship and Fellowship Plan (CSFP) Selection Interview, Federal Ministry of Education Federal Scholarship Board, Nanet Suites Abuja, December 1–5, 2014 and Member Imo State Government Transition Technical Committee (April, 2019).

Dozie is a member of many academic societies and professional association. These include American Society of Tropical Medicine & Hygiene (ASTMH); International AIDS Society (IAS); Zoological Society of Nigeria (Life Member) (ZSN); Nigerian Society of Microbiology (NSM); Parasitology and Public Health Society of Nigeria (PPSN); Biotechnology Society of Nigeria (BSN); Council for Intellectual Cooperation of Nigeria (COFICON); Council of Democratic Scholars of Nigeria (CODES);  Renewable and Alternative Energy Society of Nigeria (RAESON). He was elected, Council Member, Parasitology and Public Health Society of Nigeria (PPSN) as South East Zonal Coordinator of (2011- 2016).

He is the Chairman, Chaplaincy Pastoral Council of St. Thomas Aquinas Catholic Chaplaincy, FUT Owerri.

Research 
He had in the past carried out studies on onchocerciasis (river blindness), lymphatic filariasis, guinea worm (dracunculiasis) . His  current research interest includes  ecology, epidemiology, socioeconomic aspects and control of infectious diseases of tropical prevalence in particular, tuberculosis, HIV/AIDS, malaria, cryptosporidiosis , control of filariasis, onchocerciasis (river blindness), schistosomiasis, dracunculiasis (guinea worm), loiasis etc; Sexually transmitted infections (STIs) and reproductive health issues; Environmental sanitation, hygiene and infection control ; Exploring the potential use of whole plant therapies as compliments to anti-malarial pharmaceuticals. He has contributed to national and international scientific endeavour some of which include Council for the Development of Social Science Research in Africa (CODESRIA)  through (35/T96) Research Grant on: Socio-cultural and Economic Consequences of Onchocercal dermatitis in the Imo River basin of South Eastern Nigeria;;  UNDP/WORLD BANK/WHO Special Programme for Research and Training in Tropical Diseases, (TDR) (No. 970533) Research Grant on: Onchocerciasis and its Socioeconomic Effects in the Imo River Basin, South Eastern Nigeria; TDR Geneva Director’s Initiative Fund (DIF ID: 931087) on: Lymphatic filariasis and Onchocerciasis in the Rainforest of Nigeria: the Social Effects of Genital Complications among Woman as a coinvestigator;  National Onchocerciasis Control Programme (NOCP) Nigeria, Consultant on Rapid Epidemiological Mapping of Onchocerciasis (REMO) in Nigeria (Team Leader to Taraba, Katsina & Akwa-Ibom States during REMO refinement exercise in Nigeria (November–December, 2000); and  World Health Organization/African Programme for Onchocerciasis Control (WHO/APOC), Temporary Adviser on Rapid Epidemiological Mapping of Onchocerciasis (REMO) in South Sudan (February 28-March 28, 2003).

Awards and recognition 
Prof Dozie is a recipient of many honours and awards. They include :

  Fellow of the Society for Environmental and Public Health of Nigeria (FSEPHON), July 2019;
  Fellow of the Parasitology and Public Health Society of Nigeria (FPPSN), October, 2017;
  Fellow of the Postgraduate College of Environmental Health Science, Nigeria (FPCEHSN), October 2016;
  Fellow of the African Scientific Institute (ASI.F), September 2010;
  International Research Award by Middle States African Studies Association, West Virginia State College, US (May, 2000).

Publications 
 DOZIE, INS; OKEKE, CN & UNAEZE, NC. A thermostable, alkaline-active keratinolytic proteinase from Chrysosporium keratinophilum. World Journal of Microbiology and Biotechnology 10: 563-567 (1994).
 DOZIE, INS; ONWULIRI, COE; NWOKE, BEB. Onchocerciasis in Imo State. Community knowledge and beliefs about transmission, treatment and prevention. Public Health, 118(2): 128-130 (2004).
 DOZIE, INS; ONWULIRI, COE; NWOKE, BEB. Onchocerciasis in Imo State, Nigeria. 2. The prevalence, intensity and distribution in the Upper Imo River Basin. International Journal of Environmental Health Research, 14(5): 359-369
 DOZIE, INS; ONWULIRI, COE; NWOKE, BEB; ONWULIRI, VA. Clinical and parasitological aspects of onchocercal skin diseases in Nigeria. Tropical Doctor, 35 (3): 142-144 (2005).  
 DOZIE, INS; ONWULIRI, COE; NWOKE, BEB; CHUKWUOCHA, UM; CHIKWENDU, CI; OKORO, I; NJEMANZE, PC. Onchocerciasis and epilepsy in parts of the Imo River Basin, Nigeria: A preliminary report. Public Health, 120 (5): 448-450 (2006).
 DOZIE, INS; ONWULIRI, COE; NWOKE, BEB; CHUKWUOCHA, UM; NWOKE, EA. Prevalence of lymphatic complications due to Onchocerciasis infection. Nigerian Journal of Parasitology, 27: 23-28 (2006).
 CHUKWOCHA, UM & DOZIE, INS. Malaria transmission and mobidity patterns in holoendemic areas of Imo River Basin of Nigeria. BMC Research Notes, 4: 514-522 (2011)

References 

1966 births
Living people
Federal University of Technology Owerri alumni
University of Nigeria alumni
Academic staff of the Federal University of Technology Owerri
Nigerian microbiologists
Nigerian parasitologists